The Battle of Kannanur was fought in 1342 or 1343 at Kannanur, India. The battle was fought between the forces of the great Hoysala monarch Veera Ballala III and the Sultan of Madurai, Ghiyas-ud-Din. The brothers Harihara I and Bukka Raya I, the founders of the famous Vijayanagara Empire served the Hoysala king Veera Ballala III as governors of the Northern Hoysala territories. They were too busy fighting battles in the north, and couldn't support the Hoysala army in the South.

Battle
Ballala made great preparations for the attack of Madura, and marched in the year A. D. 1342. The Mussalman chronicler, Ibn Batuta, who was a guest at the court of the Sultan of Madura, a little while after the battle, gives a graphic description. The then reigning Sultan was Ghias-ud-din. Ballala marched with an army of 100,000 men, with the intention of conquering the Coromandal Coast, while the army of the Mussalmans was only 6,000 strong. The battle took place near Kabban (identified by Mr. Krishnaswamy Aiyangar as Kannanur-Koppam near Srirangam) which was one of the greatest and best fortified places of the Mussalmans. The battle ended in a victory for Ballala, and the Mussalmans retired to Madura. Ballala then besieged the fort of Kabban for ten months.

Aftermath
The Sultan formed a strong army of 6,000 cavalry and marched, at the head of which was the Sultan himself. Ballala’s soldiers who were not prepared for the attack, had sent their horses to graze. When they saw that the advancing army was not a band of decoits, as they had originally surmised, but the forces of Ghias-ud-din, they fled in confusion. Ballala tried to jump on his horse though he was eighty years old; he was however, captured, and killed, This ended the rule of the great Hoysalas.

Notes

References
 
 The Hoysalas, J. Duncan M. Derret, Oxford University Press, 1957
 Sastri, K.A. Nilakanta (2002) [1955]. A history of South India from prehistoric times to the fall of Vijayanagar. New Delhi: Indian Branch, Oxford University Press. .
 Kamath, Suryanath U. (2001) [1980]. A concise history of Karnataka: from pre-historic times to the present. Bangalore: Jupiter books. LCCN 80905179. OCLC 7796041.

14th century in India
1340s in Asia
Hoysala Empire
Tiruchirappalli district